The Bluesky Formation is a stratigraphic unit of Lower Cretaceous age in the Western Canada Sedimentary Basin. It takes the name from the hamlet of Bluesky, and was first described in Shell's Bluesky No. 1 well by Badgley in 1952.

Lithology and Depositional Environment
The formation is composed of mudstones, conglomerates and sandstones which can be quartzose or contain chert grains.  Many of the Bluesky sandstones do not display bedding features although some low and moderate-angle large scale cross-bedding has been observed in some sections. The sediments were deposited in both marginally marine nearshore and fully marine offshore settings following a transgression of the ancient Moosebar Sea. Bluesky sediments are separated from Gething strata by a scoured or loaded contact and occasionally by a burrowed Glossifungites surface. The Bluesky Formation can be very porous and produces hydrocarbons in many areas across Western Canada. Heavy oil is produced from the Bluesky formation in the Peace River area.

Distribution
Thin sands can be found in the Peace River area.

Relationship with other units
Although some early workers included the Bluesky Formation in the Bullhead Group, it is usually classified as the basal unit of the Fort St. John Group. It is conformably overlain by the Wilrich Member of the Spirit River Formation and conformably underlain by the Gething Formation. Northeast of the town of Peace River it was deposited unconformably on Mississippian limestone. It is equivalent with the Glauconitic Sandstone of the Mannville Group in central and southern Alberta, as well as with the Wabiskaw Member of the Clearwater Formation in the eastern part of northern Alberta.

Bitumen Deposits
The Bluesky deposit of bitumen comes from the "clean estuarine reservoir sands of the Cretaceous-age Bluesky Formation" in the Peace River. Secondary production area is the Gething Formation. The combined Bluesky-Gething deposit is the primary target area for oil sands development in the Peace River area. There is a reservoir at about – below the surface. Heavy oil in the Peace River, produced from bitumen deposit is extracted using wells not by mining.

References

Stratigraphy of Alberta